Tomtemaskinen ("The Santa Claus Machine") was the Sveriges Television's Christmas calendar in 1993. The story is based on Sven Nordqvist's books about Pettson and Findus.

Plot 
Pettson has promised the cat Findus that Santa Claus will come for Christmas. He decides to build a "Santa Machine".

Reruns 
The series was shown as a rerun in SVT 2 between 12 September-9 November 1998.

Video 
The series was released to VHS in 1997 by Independent Entertainment. and to DVD in by Pan Vision.

References

External links 
 Explore the mechanics of tomtemaskinen, tomtemaskinen.com
 
 

1993 Swedish television series debuts
1993 Swedish television series endings
Sveriges Television's Christmas calendar
Television shows based on children's books